Aengmu was the working name of a famed kisaeng of Daegu in the early 20th century.  The name literally means "parrot."  She was a leading donor to the National Debt Repayment Movement.  Donating 100 won to the cause in 1907, she explained that it was inappropriate for her to donate more than a man; but if a man donated more, she would also donate more, even unto death.

Her real name is not known; neither are her dates of birth and death.

Notes
 Daegu-Gyeongbuk Historical Research Society, p. 219.

See also
Korean independence movements
History of Korea
List of Koreans

References

Kisaeng
Korean philanthropists
People from Daegu